This page is a list of the Jacksonville Jaguars All-Pro and Pro Bowl selections.  The first Pro Bowlers selected participated in the 1996 Pro Bowl. The first All-Pros were chosen in 1997.

First-Team All-Pros

Second-Team All-Pros

Pro Bowlers

Key
 AP = Associated Press 
 PFWA = Pro Football Writers Association All-NFL
 TSN = The Sporting News All-Pro

References
 https://www.pro-football-reference.com/teams/jax/all-pros.htm

Jacksonville Jaguars lists